Alicia Melina Winter née Kummer (born June 24, 1988) is a German professional boxer and singer. She held the WIBF light welterweight title in 2017.

Professional boxing record

References

External links 
 Official website
 

1988 births
People from Harburg (district)
Living people
German women boxers
German female models
German women singers
Ninja Warrior (franchise) contestants
German beauty pageant winners
Participants in German reality television series
World welterweight boxing champions